Progress MS-15, Russian production No. 444, identified by NASA as Progress 76P, was a Progress spaceflight operated by Roscosmos to resupply the International Space Station (ISS). This was the 167th flight of a Progress spacecraft.

History 
The Progress-MS is an uncrewed freighter based on the Progress-M featuring improved avionics. This improved variant first launched on 21 December 2015. It has the following improvements:

 New external compartment that enables it to deploy satellites. Each compartment can hold up to four launch containers. First time installed on Progress MS-03.
 Enhanced redundancy thanks to the addition of a backup system of electrical motors for the docking and sealing mechanism.
 Improved Micrometeoroid (MMOD) protection with additional panels in the cargo compartment.
 Luch Russian relay satellites link capabilities enable telemetry and control even when not in direct view of ground radio stations.
 GNSS autonomous navigation enables real time determination of the status vector and orbital parameters dispensing with the need of ground station orbit determination.
 Real time relative navigation thanks to direct radio data exchange capabilities with the space station.
 New digital radio that enables enhanced TV camera view for the docking operations.
 The Ukrainian Chezara Kvant-V on board radio system and antenna/feeder system has been replaced with a Unified Command Telemetry System (UCTS).
 Replacement of the Kurs A with Kurs NA digital system.

Launch 
A Soyuz-2.1a launch vehicle was used to launch Progress MS-15 to the International Space Station. Progress MS-15 was launched at 14:26:21 UTC from Baikonur Cosmodrome Site 31 on a fast-track trajectory. Following a nominal launch, Progress MS-15 docked with the Pirs port on the ISS two orbits later at 17:45:00 UTC.

Docking 
Around 3 hours 20 minutes after the launch, Progress MS-15 successfully docked automatically at the nadir port of the Pirs module at 17:45:00 UTC, where it remained until February 2021. After its mission was completed, Progress MS-15 departed and re-entered the Earth's atmosphere for destruction over the South Pacific Ocean.

Cargo 
The following is a breakdown of cargo bound for the ISS:

 Dry cargo: 
 Fuel: 
 Oxygen: 
 Water:

Undocking and decay 
The Progress MS-15 remained docked at the station through on 9 February 2021, when it departed with trash and re-entered the Earth's atmosphere for destruction over the South Pacific Ocean. The Pirs module, originally scheduled to be removed and discarded at the end of this mission, will stay attached to the station until the arrival of the Nauka module.

See also 
 Uncrewed spaceflights to the International Space Station

References 

Progress (spacecraft) missions
Spacecraft launched in 2020
2020 in Russia
Supply vehicles for the International Space Station
Spacecraft launched by Soyuz-2 rockets
Spacecraft which reentered in 2021